The 1939 Wightman Cup was the 17th edition of the annual women's team tennis competition between the United States and Great Britain. It was held at the West Side Tennis Club in Forest Hills, Queens in New York City in the United States.

References

1939
1939 in tennis
1939 in American tennis
1939 in British sport
1939 in women's tennis
1939 in sports in New York City